In mathematics, the Bhatia–Davis inequality, named after Rajendra Bhatia and Chandler Davis, is an upper bound on the variance σ2 of any bounded probability distribution on the real line.

Statement 
Let μ be the expected value of this distribution.

Then the Bhatia–Davis inequality states:

 

Equality holds if and only if every aj in the set of values is equal either to M or to m.

Proof
Since , 

.

Thus, 

.

Extensions of the Bhatia–Davis inequality 
If  is a positive and unital linear mapping of a C* -algebra  into a C* -algebra , and A is a self-adjoint element of  satisfying m  A  M, then:

.

If  is a discrete random variable such that

 where , then:

,

Comparisons to other inequalities 
The Bhatia–Davis inequality is stronger than Popoviciu's inequality on variances as can be seen from the conditions for equality. Equality holds in Popoviciu's inequality if and only if half of the aj  are equal to the upper bounds and half of the aj  are equal to the lower bounds. Additionally, Sharma has made further refinements on the Bhatia–Davis inequality.

See also
Cramér–Rao bound
Chapman–Robbins bound
Popoviciu's inequality on variances

References 

Statistical inequalities
Theory of probability distributions